The Federal Coal Mine Safety Act of 1952 is a U.S. law authorizing the federal government to conduct annual inspections of underground coal mines with more than 15 workers, and gave the United States Bureau of Mines the authority to shut down a mine in cases of "imminent danger." The Act authorized the assessment of civil penalties against mine operators for failing to comply with an order to shut down (a "withdrawal order") or for refusing to give inspectors access to mine property.  The law did not authorize monetary penalties for noncompliance with the safety provisions. In 1966, Congress extended coverage to all underground coal mines.

The Act made ventilation mandatory in mines so as to limit the levels of methane in the air. It also required mine walls to be "dusted" with a limestone to limit the levels of coal dust.

History 

Passage of the law responded to a 1951 mine explosion which killed 111 miners in Illinois. President Truman signed the law on July 16, 1952.

Most regulation of mines was left to the U.S. states, and the Bureau of Mines or MSHA would get involved if either there were a disaster or a state agency request. Legislators apparently said that the federal 1952 law was oriented toward addressing the infrequent disasters in which five or more miners died, not preventing more common causes of deaths in mines.

See also 

 Federal Mines Safety Act of 1910
 Federal Coal Mine Health and Safety Act of 1969
 Title 30 of the Code of Federal Regulations

References

External links 
 Mine Safety and Health Administration
 Mine Safety and Health Administration in the Federal Register
 Mining Division National Institute for Occupational Safety and Health
 National Mining Association

Coal mining law
Mine safety
Occupational safety and health
1952 in law
United States federal health legislation